The 1889 Miami Redskins football team was an American football team that represented Miami University during the 1889 college football season. In its second season, Miami went undefeated and had a 4–0 record. There was no paid head coach for the season.

Schedule

References

Miami
Miami RedHawks football seasons
College football undefeated seasons
Miami Redskins football